Thermos most commonly refers to:
 Thermos L.L.C., a brand of domestic vacuum flasks
 A vacuum flask, also commonly referred to as a "thermos"

Thermos may refer to:
 Thermos (Aetolia), an ancient Greek city, the capital city of the Aetolian League
 A thermos bomb, the AR-4 anti-personnel bomb used during World War II
 A No. 73 grenade, an anti-tank hand grenade of World War II
 Thermos, a 1990 album by Bailter Space

See also 
 Thermus (disambiguation)